David Papillon FRS (1691 – 26 February 1762) of Acrise Place, Kent was a British lawyer and politician who sat in the House of Commons between 1722 and 1741.

Life
His paternal grandparents were Jane and Thomas Papillon. He was  educated at Morland’s School, Bethnal Green, London and was admitted at the Inner Temple in 1706. He continued his studies in Utrecht from 1707 to 1709, before undertaking the Grand Tour in Germany  in 1709. He was called to the bar in 1715. In 1717, he married Mary Keyser, the daughter of Timothy Keyser, a London Merchant. He was elected a Fellow of the Royal Society in 1720.

Papillon was returned unopposed as Member of Parliament for New Romney at the 1722 British general election. He was returned at a contest at the 1727 British general election, but was unseated on petition on 29 April 1728. He regained the seat at a by-election on 13 May 1728 when one of the petitioners chose to sit elsewhere. At the 1734 British general election, he was returned in contests at both New Romney and Dover on the government interest and opted to sit for Dover. He gave up his seat at Dover to the Sackville family at the 1741 British general election, in return for appointment as Commissioner of excise from 1742.

He succeeded his father to Acrise Place in 1736. In 1744 he became a bencher of his Inn. He held his post with the excise until 1754 when he arranged for it to be transferred to his son, with the help of his schoolfellow and lifelong friend, Lord Hardwicke. He died 26 Feb. 1762 leaving three sons and six daughters.

References

1691 births
1762 deaths
People from Folkestone and Hythe District
Members of the Inner Temple
Members of the Parliament of Great Britain for Dover
British MPs 1722–1727
British MPs 1727–1734
British MPs 1734–1741
Fellows of the Royal Society